Falesco is a winery and vineyard established in Montefiascone, Italy in 1979.  It has been described as a "state-of-the-art winery" and its production facilities are now located in Montecchio.  It is a family owned business, currently run by Riccardo Cotarella, his daughter Domain nah and his brother Renzo that has been described as a "sprawling property" of 670 acres, 370  of which are vineyards.  Annual production is almost 3 million bottles.  The estate straddles the border of Lazio and Umbria, about 50 miles north of Rome.

Riccardo Cotarella is assisted by winemaker Pier Paolo Chiasso.

The wines

Falesco does not utilize heavily planted, traditional Italian grape varieties such as Canaiolo and Trebbiano in its higher-quality wines.  Although these varieties produce excellent yields, the winery maintains that the quality of the wines made from those varieties are not great. Breaking with Italian tradition, "they planted the best clones of Merlot available" to produce a wine they call "Montiano".  Wine writer Lawrence Osborne has called Montiano a "globally significant wine."

Next, they bought a large hillside vineyard south of Orvieto which is planted in Cabernet Sauvignon.  From these vines, they produce their wine called "Marciliano".

The winery also produces a distinctive local white wine called Est! Est!! Est!!! di Montefiascone.
  This wine is "composed of 60 percent Trebbiano 30 percent Malvasia and 10 percent Roscetto", and is considered a "generic Umbrian cheap white known around the world."

They sell a white wine made from the roscetto grape is called "Ferentano".

Another of their offerings is a sweet wine called Aleatico di Gradoli.

Falesco has two product lines based on terroir.  The "Latium Line" comprises wines from Montefiascone in the Viterbo province in Latium, and the "Umbria line" comprises wines produced in the Montecchio and Orvieto area.

References

Wineries of Italy